Anzhelika Churkina  (born ) is a Ukrainian Paralympic sitting volleyball player. She is part of the Ukraine women's national sitting volleyball team.

She competed at the 2012 Summer Paralympics, winning the bronze medal, after beating the Netherlands in the bronze medal match. She competed in the 2016 Summer Paralympics.

See also
 Ukraine at the 2012 Summer Paralympics

References

1969 births
Living people
Volleyball players at the 2012 Summer Paralympics
Paralympic volleyball players of Ukraine
Ukrainian sitting volleyball players
Women's sitting volleyball players
Place of birth missing (living people)
Paralympic bronze medalists for Ukraine
Volleyball players at the 2016 Summer Paralympics
Medalists at the 2012 Summer Paralympics
Paralympic medalists in volleyball